Content, also known as C.C. Harper Farm, is a historic home located near Centreville, Queen Anne's County, Maryland, United States. It is of brick construction, two stories high, five bays wide and one room deep, with a single flush brick chimney. The house was constructed about 1775.  Also on the property are a small Flemish bond brick dairy and a meathouse.

Content was listed on the National Register of Historic Places in 1986.

References

External links
, including photo from 1981, at Maryland Historical Trust

Houses in Queen Anne's County, Maryland
Houses on the National Register of Historic Places in Maryland
Houses completed in 1787
1787 establishments in Maryland
National Register of Historic Places in Queen Anne's County, Maryland